Grishk, also spelled Gereshk, is a town in Grishk District of Helmand province, geographically located along the Helmand River in Afghanistan, some  northwest of Kandahar, at  altitude. Upstream lies the Kajaki Dam which diverts water to the Boghra Irrigation Canal, an essential infrastructure for the region's crops. Grishk Dam is also nearby. Grishk was originally built around a fort on the east bank of the river but was later rebuilt on the west. The fort was twice captured by the British: first in the First Anglo-Afghan War and again in 1879. In both cases the fort was later abandoned. Grishk has a population of about 48,546 and has a hospital and a school of engineering which was built back in 1957.

Grishk is located on the important transport route known as Highway 1, which was built during the time of the Soviet–Afghan War. This route links Farah Province in the west and to Kandahar Province in the east. As part of Operation Moshtarak the British Army and Afghan workers are constructing Route Trident, a road that will eventually connect Grishk with the provincial capital of Lashkar Gah. Grishk is also the southern terminus of Route 611. The area is irrigated by the Helmand and Arghandab Valley Authority.

Climate
Grishk has a hot desert climate (Köppen BWh), characterised by little precipitation and high variation between summer and winter temperatures. The average temperature in Grishk is 19.6 °C, while the annual precipitation averages 117 mm. Summers start in mid-May, last until late-September, and are extremely dry. July is the hottest month of the year with an average temperature of 32.2 °C. The coldest month January has an average temperature of 7.0 °C.

Ethnography
The population of Grishk is primarily made up of Pashtuns, along with large minorities of Hazaras and Shia Tajiks, being one of the only regions of Helmand province with a significant Shia minority. Grishk was under control of Noorzai tribe during the time of first Taliban government, and Mullah Mir Hamza an ethnic Pashtun from Noorzai tribe was the District governor of Grishk, while Mullah Mahmmad Azam an ethnic Pashtun from Noorzai tribe was the commander of Taliban forces in Grishk.

Operation Enduring Freedom

In November, 2003, Afghan Civilian Abdul Wahed died in Grishk at the special forces base, after being exposed to torture by the Afghan army. In April 2008 the 2nd Battalion 7th Marines, Echo Co, which was sent there to help support train the Afghan Police, worked with the Danish and British military.

On December 4, 2008, two Danish soldiers were killed near Grishk.

In June 2017, the son of Taliban leader Hebatullah Akhundzadeh, named Hafiz Abdul Rahman, committed a suicide attack against Afghan forces based in the city.

The city, along with other parts of Helmand province and the whole of Afghanistan, fell to Taliban forces as a result of the 2021 Taliban offensive.

See also
 Helmand Province

References

Populated places in Helmand Province